Sean Bowie, best known by the recording alias Yves Tumor, is an American musician and producer of experimental music, born in Miami, Florida and currently based in Turin, Italy.

Tumor uses they/them and he/him pronouns. To date, they have released five studio albums: When Man Fails You (2015), Serpent Music (2016), Safe in the Hands of Love (2018), Heaven to a Tortured Mind (2020) and Praise a Lord Who Chews but Which Does Not Consume; (Or Simply, Hot Between Worlds) (2023).

Life and career
Raised in Knoxville, Tennessee, Tumor started making music at age 16 as an outlet away from "dull, conservative surroundings." They taught themself to play drums, bass, guitar, and keyboards. Describing their experience growing up in Tennessee as unpleasant, Yves moved at age 20 to San Diego, and then after college, to Los Angeles. They met Mykki Blanco in 2012, later touring for two and a half years throughout Europe and Asia.

In the early 2010s, Tumor recorded as Teams, and made music which AllMusic described as "post-chillwave". They debuted the Yves Tumor project in 2015 with an EP for Berlin's experimental club label Janus, and another one for Blanco's label, Dogfood MG. That same year, they released their first album, When Man Fails You (which would later be re-released by Apothecary Compositions on April 29, 2016).

In September 2016, Tumor signed with PAN Records and released their label debut, Serpent Music. Yves had worked on the album for three years after moving to Leipzig, Germany. The album was recorded between Miami, Leipzig, Los Angeles and Berlin. In Pitchforks review of the album, critic Andy Beta compared Tumor's musical style to James Ferraro and Dean Blunt, and noted their use of "unsettling percussive loops and field recordings to create a mood as if lost in a strange urban landscape."

In September 2017, Tumor released a compilation album titled Experiencing the Deposit of Faith for free. Later that week, it was revealed through a tour announcement that Tumor had signed to Warp Records. Following the announcement, the artist embarked on a tour with a new audiovisual show.

In September 2018, Tumor released their Warp debut, Safe in the Hands of Love, with no prior announcement. It was preceded by the singles "Noid" on July 24, "Licking an Orchid" featuring James K on August 29, and "Lifetime" on September 3. The album received universal acclaim from music critics. Pitchforks Jayson Greene stated in the review that the album "dwarfs everything the artist has released by several orders of magnitude. The leap is so audacious it's disorienting."

Tumor's fourth album, Heaven to a Tortured Mind, was released on April 3, 2020, preceded on March 3 by the single "Kerosene" featuring Diana Gordon. Alexis Petridis, reviewing the album for The Guardian, awarded it Album of the Week, describing it as "extraordinary: experimental, capable of any genre, with an internal logic powering its shifts in mood.[…] There’s real skill involved in coming up with something that sounds coherent while shifting through so many styles.”

In October 2020, Tumor said in an interview with Michèle Lamy " I have another EP and a whole album basically not finished, but ready to start finishing. I’ve been very busy during the quarantine." In December 2020, Tumor released the single "let all the poisons that lurk in the mud seep out" in collaboration with Kelsey Lu, featuring Kelly Moran and Moses Boyd. In July 2021, they released the EP The Asymptotical World, recorded in collaboration with their bandmates, Chris Greatti and Yves Rothman.

Musical style
Tumor's earlier work was compared to that of Dean Blunt and James Ferraro, the latter of whom they have collaborated with; however, their more recent music, such as Heaven to a Tortured Mind, has been likened to Prince and David Bowie.

Tumor has cited Throbbing Gristle as an influence, saying: "Sonically, Throbbing Gristle (were very inspirational). There’s something about their music, like the hypnotic trance vibes, that really influenced me. When I moved to Los Angeles after college, a good friend of mine would always play Chris & Cosey records when we were hanging out. I slowly became obsessed with them and started reading about Genesis P-Orridge and that whole movement."

Personal life
In 2020, during the COVID-19 pandemic, Tumor designed furniture and furthered their interest in upholstery: "I just got really into my other hobbies, which include architecture and interior architecture, and urban architecture, but I’m not that good at math, so I wanted to scale everything down. I just decided to just start constructing chairs and couches and stools, but I think I’m going to begin welding as opposed to actual construction."

Backing band
In the studio and during live performances Tumor is joined by:

Chris Greatti - lead guitar (2019–present)
Gina Ramirez - bass guitar (2019–present)
Yves Rothman - electronics, samples (2019–present)
Rhys Hastings - drums (2019–present)

Discography

Studio albums

Extended plays

Compilation albums

Singles

Guest appearances

Remixes

Notes

Awards and nominations

References

External links
 Yves Tumor on Warp

Living people
Year of birth missing (living people)
Ambient musicians
American electronic musicians
American experimental musicians
African-American rock musicians
21st-century American musicians
Musicians from Knoxville, Tennessee
Warp (record label) artists
American expatriates in Italy
African-American rock singers
Non-binary musicians
LGBT African Americans
American LGBT musicians
21st-century African-American musicians